The EMD GP8 is a model of four-axle diesel locomotive rebuilt by Illinois Central's Paducah shops using a General Motors Electro-Motive Division (EMD) GP7, GMD GP7 or GP9 as a start. It is similar to the GP10 and GP11.

A total of 111 units were rebuilt to "GP8" for the Illinois Central and Illinois Central Gulf. Core units used in the construction of these units were Illinois Central GP7, GP9, a GP8, C&O GP9, D&RGW GP9, DT&I GP7, N&W GP7, P&LE GP7, QNS&L GP7, RDG GP7, St.J&LC GP9, SLSF GP7, and SP GP9.

The Paducah Shops also rebuilt 16 Conrail GP7s to GP8s. Nine were rebuilt in 1976 and another seven in 1978. Rock Island's Silvis Shops rebuilt 20 Conrail GP7s into GP8s in 1978. Morrison-Knudsen's Boise Shops rebuilt 13 Conrail GP7s into GP8s in 1978. The 1976 Conrail units rebuilt at Paducah were the equivalent of the Illinois Central rebuilds. The 1978 rebuilds were engine and electrical gear only rebuilds with no carbody modifications.

References 

 
 

B-B locomotives
GP08
Illinois Central locomotives
Diesel-electric locomotives of the United States
Conrail locomotives
Rebuilt locomotives
Standard gauge locomotives of the United States